Mohamed Badr (born 13 October 1929) is an Egyptian wrestler. He competed in the men's freestyle lightweight at the 1952 Summer Olympics.

References

External links

1929 births
Possibly living people
Egyptian male sport wrestlers
Olympic wrestlers of Egypt
Wrestlers at the 1952 Summer Olympics
Place of birth missing (living people)
20th-century Egyptian people